Lorna French is a British playwright and the two-time winner of the Alfred Fagon Award for the best new play by a Black playwright of African or Caribbean descent living in the United Kingdom. Her Fagon Award winner plays are Safe House and City Melodies. French is of mixed Jamaican and Zimbabwean heritage.

Career 
French co-created the play These Four Walls with Naylah Ahmed, Sonali Bhattacharyya, Jennifer Farmer, Amber Lone and Cheryl Akila Payne. The play was commissioned by the Birmingham Repertory Theatre and was created based on interviews with those affected by the Lozells Riot in 2005.

She was a writer-in-residence at the New Wolsey Theatre in Ipswich in 2008–2009, and earned an MPhil in Playwriting from the University of Birmingham in 2011.

French won the 2016 Alfred Fagon Award for her play City Melodies, which explores the lives of first- and second-generation immigrants in London, and their perseverance in the face of adversity. She previously won the same award in 2006 for her play Safe House.

The Octagon Theatre has commissioned plays or scenes from Lorna French on two occasions. In 2016, they produced a stage version of To Kill a Mockingbird, and commissioned three playwrights to each write a scene that provided additional perspective on the play. French's scene introduces a new character, Tom Robinson's daughter, and a black parallel to Scout. Two years later, Octagon commissioned French and Janys Chambers to write a new stage adaptation of Charlotte Brontë's novel Jane Eyre; it premiered at the Octagon in January 2018.

She cites as influences Caryl Churchill, debbie tucker green, and Arthur Miller, as well as Toni Morrison and Sam Selvon.

Plays 

 Safe House, 2006
Inside My Skin, 2008
 These Four Streets, 2009 [co-author]
Positive, 2011
 City Melodies, 2016
additional scene for To Kill a Mockingbird, 2016
 Jane Eyre, 2018 [co-adapter, with Janys Chambers]

References 

British dramatists and playwrights
Living people
Year of birth missing (living people)
Place of birth missing (living people)
Black British women writers